Sylvia Jagwe Owachi is a Ugandan businesswoman, banker and corporate executive, who serves as the chief executive officer in acting capacity, at Cairo Bank Uganda, a commercial bank in that East African country, effective 1 January 2021. Before her current assignment, she was the executive director at Cairo Bank Uganda, from July 2021 until December 2021.

Early life and education
She was born in Uganda . She attended Gayaza High School for both her O-Level and A-Level education. In 1993, she was admitted to Makerere University, Uganda's oldest and largest public university, where she graduated with a Bachelor of Commerce degree, majoring in finance. Later, she was awarded a Master of Business Administration degree, by Heriot-Watt University, in Edinburgh, Scotland, United Kingdom.

Career
According her online profile, she joined Standard Chartered Uganda (SCBU), in June 1996. She worked there full-time in various roles including as credit analyst, relationship manager and corporate service manager. In 2007, she was promoted to senior credit manager, then to senior risk manager in 2010 and to senior relationship manager local corporates and international corporates. Her last assignment at SCBU, for the last two years of her tenure there, was as the head of commodity traders & agribusiness at the bank.

In 2016, she left SCBU an was hired by Guaranty Trust Bank Uganda, serving there as the head of corporate banking for over four years. In June 2020, Owachi was appointed an executive director at Cairo Bank Uganda. She served in that role until January 2022, when she was promoted to acting CEO/managing director at that bank.

Family
She is a married mother of three sons.

Other considerations
As the acting CEO of Cairo Bank Uganda, Owachi replaced 
Ahmad Maher Nada, an Egyptian national, who had led the bank for the previous three and one half years. In January 2022, he took up another assignment with Banque du Caire in Egypt.

See also
 Immaculate Irumba

References

External links
 Website of Cairo Bank Uganda

Living people
1970s births
Ugandan bankers
Ugandan businesspeople
Ugandan chief executives
Ugandan business executives
Makerere University alumni
Alumni of Heriot-Watt University
People educated at Gayaza High School
Ugandan women business executives
Ugandan women chief executives